Acteon is a genus of small sea snails, predatory marine gastropod mollusks in the family Acteonidae, the barrel bubble snails.

The genus is named after Acteon, a character in Greek mythology.

Description
The shell is convoluted, ovate, cylindrical, generally transversely striated. The aperture is oblong, entire, somewhat effuse at its base. It shows one or more folds upon the columella. The outer lip is thin, sharp, never having a varix.

The species of this genus are all marine, and convolute. They are almost always transversely striated. They are generally oval and cylindrical. The spire is more or less projecting and obtuse. The aperture is 
elongated, often narrowed at its posterior part, widened and somewhat effuse at its base. The folds of the columella vary from one to three. They are generally thick and obtuse.

In the genus Acteon, the individual teeth of the radula are very small. There are many teeth in each row.

Species
According to the World Register of Marine Species (WoRMS), the following species with accepted names are included in the genus Acteon

 Acteon antarcticus Thiele, 1912
 Acteon aphyodes Valdès, 2008
 Acteon archibenthicola Habe, 1955
 Acteon areatus Verco, 1907
 † Acteon articulatus Marwick, 1931 
 Acteon baracoensis Espinosa & Ortea, 2014 
 Acteon biplicatus Strebel, 1908
 Acteon boteroi Valdès, 2008
 Acteon buccinus Valdès, 2008
 Acteon candens Rehder, 1939
 Acteon castus Hinds, 1844
 Acteon cebuanus Lan, 1985
 † Acteon chattonensis Marwick, 1929 
 Acteon chauliodous Valdès, 2008
 Acteon chrystomatus Valdès, 2008
 Acteon cohibilis Valdès, 2008
 Acteon comptus Valdès, 2008
 Acteon conicus Thiele, 1925
 Acteon danaida Dall, 1881
 Acteon dancei Poppe, Tagaro & Stahlschmidt, 2015
 Acteon delicatus Dall, 1889
 Acteon dolichoroseus Iredale, 1936
 Acteon editus Valdès, 2008
 Acteon elongatus Castellanos, Rolán & Bartolotta, 1987
 Acteon exiguus Mörch, 1875
 Acteon fasuloi Crocetta, Romani, Simone & Rolán, 2017
 Acteon finlayi Stearns, 1898
 Acteon fortis Thiele, 1925
 Actaeon fragilis Thiele, 1925]
 Acteon fructuosus Iredale, 1936 
 Acteon hebes A. E. Verrill, 1885
 Acteon herosae Valdès, 2008
 Acteon incisus Dall, 1881
 † Acteon infulatus Marwick, 1931 
 Acteon insculptus (Reeve, 1842)
 Acteon ionfasciatus Valdès, 2008
 Acteon isabella Poppe, Tagaro & Goto, 2018
 Acteon juvenis Dall, 1927
 Acteon lacunatus Dall, 1927
 Acteon laetus Thiele, 1925
 Acteon loyautensis Valdès, 2008
 Acteon maltzani  Dautzenberg, 1910
 Acteon melampoides  Dall, 1881
 Acteon mirim Cunha, 2011
 Acteon monterosatoi  Dautzenberg, 1889
 Acteon nakayamai Habe, 1952
 † Acteon oneroaensis Powell & Bartrum, 1929 
 Acteon osexiguus Valdès, 2008
 † Acteon otamateaensis Laws, 1941 
 † Acteon pahaka Maxwell, 1992 †
 Acteon panamensis Dall, 1908
 Acteon parallelus Dall, 1927
 Acteon particolor Dall, 1927
 Acteon pelecais Marcus, 1972
 Acteon perforatus Dall, 1881
  † Acteon procratericulatus Laws, 1939
 Acteon profundus Valdès, 2008
 Acteon pudicus (A. Adams), 1854
 Acteon retusus Verco, 1907 
 Acteon rhektos Valdès, 2008
 Acteon ringiculoides Valdès, 2008
 Acteon roseus Hedley, 1906
 Acteon secale Gould, 1859
 Acteon semicingulatus Dall, 1927
 Acteon semisculptus E. A. Smith, 1890
 † Acteon semispiralis P. Marshall, 1917
 Acteon senegalensis (Petit de la Saussaye, 1851)
 Acteon soyoae Habe, 1961
 Acteon splendidulus Mörch, 1875
 Acteon subincisus Okutani, 1968
 Acteon subroseus Iredale, 1936
 Acteon teramachii Habe, 1950
 Acteon tornatilis (Linnaeus, 1758)
 Acteon traskii Stearns, 1898
 Acteon valentina Poppe, Tagaro & Stahlschmidt, 2015
 Acteon vangoethemi Poppe, Tagaro & Stahlschmidt, 2015
 Acteon venustus d'Orbigny, 1840
 Acteon virgatus (Reeve, 1842)
  † Acteon wangaloa Finlay & Marwick, 1937
 Acteon yamamurae Habe, 1976

Taxa inquirenda
 Acteon (Metactaeon) Thiele, 1931 
 Acteon mariae  A. Adams, 1855
 Acteon modestus  A. Adams, 1855

Species brought into synonymy
 Acteon (Maxacteon) Rudman, 1971: synonym of Maxacteon Rudman, 1971
 Acteon aequatorialis Thiele, 1925: synonym of Metactaeon aequatorialis (Thiele, 1925)
 Acteon albus Sowerby, 1874: synonym of  Rictaxis albus (Sowerby III, 1874)
 Acteon amabilis Watson, 1886: synonym of  Colostracon amabile (Watson, 1886)
 Acteon augustoi Nobre, 1932: synonym of Acteon tornatilis (Linnaeus, 1758)
  Acteon austrinus Watson, 1881: synonym of  Leucotina casta (A. Adams, 1853)
 Acteon browni Jordan, 1895: synonym of Crenilabium exile (Jeffreys, 1870)
 Acteon candidulus Monterosato, 1923: synonym of  Acteon tornatilis (Linnaeus, 1758)
 Acteon chariis Watson, 1886: synonym of Callostracon chariis (Watson, 1886)
 Acteon cratericulatus Hedley, 1906: synonym of Maxacteon cratericulatus (Hedley, 1906) 
 Acteon cumningi A. Adams, 1855: synonym of Mysouffa cumingii (A. Adams, 1855)
 Acteon dianae A. Adams, 1855: synonym of  Leucotina casta (A. Adams, 1853)
 Acteon eloisae [sic]: synonym of  Acteon eloiseae Abbott, 1973
 Acteon eloiseae Abbott, 1973; synonym of Punctacteon eloiseae (Abbott, 1973)
 Acteon etheridgii Bell T., 1870: synonym of Crenilabium exile (Jeffreys, 1870)
 Acteon exilis Jeffreys, 1870: synonym of Crenilabium exile (Jeffreys, 1870)
 Acteon fabreanus Crosse, 1873: synonym of Maxacteon fabreanus (Crosse, 1874)
 Acteon flammea  (Gmelin, 1791): synonym of  Maxacteon flammeus (Bruguière, 1789)
 Acteon flammeus (Bruguière, 1789): synonym of  Maxacteon flammeus (Bruguière, 1789)
 Acteon huttoni Cossmann, 1895: synonym of  Leucotina casta (A. Adams, 1853)
 Acteon kajiyamai (Habe, 1976): synonym of Punctacteon kajiyamai Habe, 1976
 Acteon kawamurai Habe, 1952: synonym of Maxacteon kawamurai (Habe, 1952)
 Acteon kirai Habe, 1949: synonym of Punctacteon kirai (Habe, 1949)
 Acteon liostracoides Dall, 1927: synonym of Crenilabium exile (Jeffreys, 1870)
 Acteon longissimus (Valdés, 2008): synonym of Japonactaeon longissimus Valdés, 2008
 Acteon natalensis (Barnard, 1963): synonym of Acteocina fusiformis A. Adams, 1850
 Acteon nipponensis Yamakawa, 1911: synonym of Japonactaeon nipponensis (Yamakawa, 1911)
 Acteon nitidus Verrill, 1882: synonym of Crenilabium exile (Jeffreys, 1870)
 Acteon pilsbryi Cossmann, 1902: synonym of  Pupa affinis (A. Adams, 1855)
 Acteon praestitus Finlay, 1924: synonym of  Leucotina casta (A. Adams, 1853)
 Acteon propius Dall, 1927: synonym of Crenilabium exile (Jeffreys, 1870)
 Acteon punctocaelatus(Carpenter, 1864) : synonym of  Rictaxis punctocaelatus Carpenter, 1864 
 Acteon punctostriatus (C. B. Adams, 1840): synonym of  Japonactaeon punctostriatus (C. B. Adams, 1840)
 Acteon pygmaeus Grateloup, 1838: synonym of Chrysallida stefanisi (Jeffreys, 1869)
 † Acteon reticulatus Martin, 1884: synonym of  † Pupa reticulata (Martin, 1884) 
 Acteon semistriatus Glibert, 1952: synonym of Acteon tornatilis (Linnaeus, 1758)
 Actaeon senegalensis von Maltzan, 1885 : synonym of Acteon maltzani Dautzenberg, 1910
 Acteon sieboldii (Reeve 1842): synonym of Japonactaeon sieboldii (Reeve, 1842)
 Acteon subulatus Wood S., 1848: synonym of Acteon tornatilis (Linnaeus, 1758)
 Acteon torrei Aguayo & Rehder, 1936: synonym of  Bullina torrei (Aguayo & Rehder, 1936)
 Acteon vagabundus Mabille & de Rochebrune, 1885: synonym of Toledonia vagabunda (Mabille, 1885)
 Acteon variegatus (Bruguiere, 1789): synonym of Punctacteon variegatus (Bruguière, 1789)
 † Acteon wetherellii Lea, 1833: synonym of Acteocina canaliculata (Say, 1826)

The Indo-Pacific molluscan Database also includes the following species:
 Acteon aethiopicus Martens, 1902
 Acteon edentulus Watson, 1883
 Acteon lactuca
 Acteon minutus
 Acteon pulchrior Melvill, 1904

The Integrated Taxonomic Information System (ITIS) also includes the following species:
 Acteon pusillus (Forbes, 1844)

 Acteon aethiopicus Martens, E.C. von, 1902
 Acteon antarcticus Thiele, 1912
 Distribution : subantarctic
 Length : 6.6 mm
 Description : found at depths of 120 to 340 m
 Acteon archibenthicola Habe, 1955
 Distribution : Indo-Pacific
 Acteon biplicatus Strebel, 1908
 Distribution : subantarctic, Argentina, Falkland Islands, Tierra del Fuego
 Length : 4.4 mm
 Description : found at depths of 16 to 150 m
 Acteon candens Rehder, 1939 Rehder’s baby bubble
 Distribution : Caribbean, Gulf of Mexico, North Carolina, Florida, Western Atlantic Ocean.
 Length ; 10 mm
 Description : found at depths of 10 to 20 m; glossy white shell with five whorls; body whorl contains at the base three brown spiraling bands; the top of each whorl has a narrow brown band.
 Acteon castus Hinds, 1844
 Distribution : West America
 Acteon cumingii Adams, 1854 (taxon inquirendum)
 Distribution : Brazil, Florida
 Length : 10–20 mm
 Description : found at depths of 10 to 360 m; lightbrown shell with a large first whorl; each whorl with many spiral windings.; outer lip notched.
 Acteon danaida Dall, 1881
 Distribution : Georgia, Caribbean, NE Brazil
 Length : 11 mm
 Description :.found at depths of 370 to 620 m; white translucent shell with five whorls.
 Acteon delicatus Dall, 1889
 Distribution :Florida, Caribbean, Gulf of Mexico.
 Length : 10 mm
 Description : found at depths of 135 to 565 m
 Acteon dolichoroseus Iredale, 1936
 Distribution : Indo-Pacific
 Acteon edentulus Watson, 1883
 Distribution : Indo-Pacific
 Acteon elongatus Castellanos, Rolán & Bartolotta, 1987
 Distribution : Argentina
 Length : 8.5 mm
 Description : found at depths of 150 to 600 m
 Acteon exiguus Mörch, 1875
 Distribution : Venezuela, Surinam.
 Length : 6.5 mm
 Description : found at depths of 14 to 18 m
 Acteon finlayi McGinty, 1955
 Distribution : Florida, Caribbean
 Length : 12 mm
 Description : found at depths up to 360 m
 Acteon fortis Thiele, 1925
 Distribution : Indo-Pacific
 Acteon hebes A. E. Verrill, 1885
 Distribution : Georgia, North Carolina.
 Length : 8 mm
 Description : deepsea species; found at depths of 800 to 4700 m
 Acteon incisus Dall, 1881
 Distribution : Georgia, Mexico, Cuba
 Length : 10 mm
 Description : found at depths of 30 to 1170 m
 Acteon juvenis Dall, 1927
 Distribution : Georgia
 Length : 3 mm
 Description : found at depths of over 500 m
 Acteon lacunatus Dall, 1927
 Distribution : Georgia
 Length : 3 mm
 Description : found at depths of 800 m
 Acteon mariae A. Adams, 1855 (taxon inquirendum)
 Distribution : Indo-Pacific
 Acteon melampoides Dall, 1881
 Distribution : Virginia, Florida, Caribbean
 Length : 9.6 mm
 Description : deepsea species; found at depths of 400 to 4700 m
 Acteon minutus (author unknown)
 Distribution : Indo-Pacific
 Acteon monterosatoi Dautzenberg, 1889
 Distribution : Europe, Mediterranean, Azores
 Acteon nakayamai Habe, 1952
 Distribution : Japan
 Acteon ovulum (Pfeiffer, 1840) 
 Distribution : Cuba
 Length : 3.6 mm
 Description :
 Acteon panamensis Dall, 1908
 Distribution : Panama
 Acteon parallelus Dall, 1927
 Distribution : Georgia
 Length : 3 mm
 Description : found at depths of 530 to 800 m
 Acteon particolor Dall, 1927
 Distribution : Georgia
 Length : 3.5 mm
 Description : found at depths of 800 m
 Acteon pelecais Marcus, 1972
 Distribution : Brazil
 Length : 9.5 mm
 Description : found at depths to 85 m
 Acteon perforatus Dall, 1881
 Distribution : Mexico, Cuba
 Length : 14 mm
 Description : found at depths of 330 to 1450 m
 Acteon proprius Dall, 1927
 Distribution : America, Georgia.
 Length : 4.3 mm
 Acteon pudicus Adams, 1854
 Distribution : Indo-Pacific
 Acteon pulchrior Melvill, 1904 
 Distribution : Indo-Pacific
 Acteon retusus Verco, 1907
 Distribution : Australia
 Acteon roseus Hedley, 1906
 Distribution : Indo-Pacific
 Acteon semicingulatus Dall, 1927
 Distribution : Georgia
 Length : 3 mm
 Description : found at depths of 500 m
 Acteon semisculptus E. A. Smith, 1890
 Distribution : Eastern Atlantic, St. Helena
 Length : 4 mm
 Acteon senegalensis Petit de la Saussaye
 Distribution : West Africa
 Acteon soyoae Habe, 1961
 Distribution : Indo-Pacific
 Acteon splendidulus Mörch, 1875
 Distribution : Caribbean
 Length : 4.8 mm
 Acteon subincisus Okutani, 1968
 Distribution : Indo-Pacific
 Acteon subroseus Iredale, 1936
 Distribution : Indo-Pacific
 Acteon teramachii Habe, 1950
 Distribution : Indo-Pacific
 Acteon tornatilis Linnaeus, 1767 Lathe acteon
 Acteon traskii Stearns, 1897
 Distribution : California, Panama
 Length : 18 mm
 Acteon venustus d'Orbigny, 1840
 Distribution : West America
 Acteon virgatus (= Punctacteon virgatus) Reeve, 1842 Striped acteon
 Distribution : SW Pacific
 Length : 25 mm
 Description : cream-colored convex shell with five whorls with many spiral grooves; transversely decorated with wavy darkbrown bands,.

References

 Vaught, K.C. (1989). A classification of the living Mollusca. American Malacologists: Melbourne, FL (USA). . XII, 195 pp.
 Gofas, S.; Le Renard, J.; Bouchet, P. (2001). Mollusca, in: Costello, M.J. et al. (Ed.) (2001). European register of marine species: a check-list of the marine species in Europe and a bibliography of guides to their identification. Collection Patrimoines Naturels, 50: pp. 180–213
 Spencer, H.; Marshall. B. (2009). All Mollusca except Opisthobranchia. In: Gordon, D. (Ed.) (2009). New Zealand Inventory of Biodiversity. Volume One: Kingdom Animalia. p 584
 Montfort P. [Denys de]. (1808-1810). Conchyliologie systématique et classification méthodique des coquilles. Paris: Schoell. Vol. 1: pp. lxxxvii + 409 [1808]. Vol. 2: pp. 676 + 16

External links 

 Thiele, Johannes. "Die antarktischen schnecken und muscheln." Deutsche Südpolar-Expedition (1901–1903) 13 (1912): 183-286
  Serge GOFAS, Ángel A. LUQUE, Joan Daniel OLIVER,José TEMPLADO & Alberto SERRA (2021) - The Mollusca of Galicia Bank (NE Atlantic Ocean); European Journal of Taxonomy 785: 1–114

Acteonidae